Ellobium is a genus of medium-sized, air-breathing, saltmarsh snails, terrestrial pulmonate gastropod mollusks in the family Ellobiidae.

Ellobium is the type genus of the family Ellobiidae.

Species
Species within the genus Ellobium include:
 Ellobium abollenense (Fontannes, 1877) †
 Ellobium aurisjudae (Linnaeus, 1758)
 Ellobium aurismidae  (Linnaeus, 1758)
 Ellobium boriesi (Plaziat, 1970) †
 Ellobium chinense (Pfeiffer, 1864)
 Ellobium citharellaeforme Wenz, 1922 †
 Ellobium dominicense (Férussac, 1821)
 Ellobium gangeticum (L. Pfeiffer, 1855)
 Ellobium gaziense (Preston, 1913)
 Ellobium grateloupi (Tournouër, 1871) †
 Ellobium hanleyanum (Gassies, 1869)
 Ellobium heberti (Vasseur, 1881) †
 Ellobium incrassatum (H. Adams & A. Adams, 1854)
 Ellobium koerti Huckriede, 1967 †
 Ellobium lorteti (Fontannes, 1876) †
 Ellobium namneticum (Vasseur, 1881) †
 Ellobium oblongum (Deshayes, 1830) †
 Ellobium olivaeforme (Briart & Cornet, 1887) †
 Ellobium pontileviense (de Morgan, 1917) †
 Ellobium pyramidale Sowerby, 1822
 Ellobium requienii (Matheron, 1843) †
 Ellobium roberti (de Morgan, 1917) †
 Ellobium scheepmakeri (Petit de la Saussaye, 1850)
 Ellobium scotinum (Cossmann, 1902) †
 Ellobium semisculptum H. Adams & A. Adams, 1854
 Ellobium simplex (Cossmann, 1895) † (taxon inquirendum)
 Ellobium stagnale (d'Orbigny, 1835)
 Ellobium strangulatum (de Morgan, 1917) †
 Ellobium subjudae (A. d'Orbigny, 1852) †
 Ellobium subnodosum (Metcalfe, 1851)
 Ellobium tornatelliforme (Petit de la Saussaye, 1843)
 Ellobium vicentinum (Fuchs, 1870) †
Species brought into synonymy
 Ellobium australe Röding, 1798: synonym of Placostylus fibratus (Martyn, 1784)
 Ellobium barbadense Röding, 1798: synonym of Melampus coffea (Linnaeus, 1758)
 Ellobium dactylus (Pfeiffer, 1854): synonym of Ellobium aurisjudae (Linnaeus, 1758)
 Ellobium durlstonense Arkell, 1941 †: synonym of Juramarinula durlstonensis (Arkell, 1941) † (new combination)
 Ellobium gangetica [sic]: synonym of Ellobium gangeticum (L. Pfeiffer, 1855)
 Ellobium grande (Briart & Cornet, 1887) †: synonym of Semiauricula grandis (Briart & Cornet, 1887) † (new combination)
 Ellobium labrosum Röding, 1798: synonym of Ellobium aurisjudae (Linnaeus, 1758)
 Ellobium midae Röding, 1798: synonym of Ellobium aurismidae (Linnaeus, 1758)
 Ellobium oparicum H. Adams & A. Adams, 1854: synonym of Auriculastra oparica (H. Adams & A. Adams, 1854) (original combination)
 Ellobium semiplicatum H. Adams & A. Adams, 1854: synonym of Auriculastra semiplicata (H. Adams & A. Adams, 1854) (original combination)
 Ellobium subtile Röding, 1798: synonym of Ellobium aurisjudae (Linnaeus, 1758)

References

 Raven H. & Vermeulen J.J. (2007). Notes on molluscs from NW Borneo and Singapore. 2. A synopsis of the Ellobiidae (Gastropoda, Pulmonata). Vita Malacologica. 4: 29-62

External links 
 Lamarck, J.B.M. (1799). Prodrome d'une nouvelle classification des coquilles, comprenant une rédaction appropriée des caractères géneriques, et l'établissement d'un grand nombre de genres nouveaux. Mémoires de la Société d'Histoire Naturelle de Paris. 1: 63-91.
  Martins, A. M. de F. (1996) Anatomy and systematics of the Western Atlantic Ellobiidae (Gastropoda: Pulmonata). Malacologia 37: 163-332
 Australian Biological Resources Study
 Note on one of the species

Ellobiidae